The February Revolution usually refers to the first of two revolutions in Russia in 1917.

February Revolution may also refer to:
French Revolution of 1848
2014 Ukraine revolution
February Revolution (Paraguay) in 1936
Austrian Civil War in 1934